James Phinney Baxter III (February 15, 1893 in Portland, Maine – June 17, 1975 in Williamstown, Massachusetts) was an American historian, educator, and academic, who won the 1947 Pulitzer Prize for History for his book Scientists Against Time (1946). He was also the author of The Introduction of the Ironclad Warship (1933).

Life

Baxter was the grandson of historian and mayor of Portland, Maine, James Phinney Baxter and the son of Maine Governor Percival Proctor Baxter.  He attended Portland High School and Phillips Academy in Andover, Massachusetts, followed by Williams College, where he was graduated as valedictorian with Phi Beta Kappa honors, was a member of The Kappa Alpha Society, and served as president of the Gargoyle Society.  He obtained M.A. degrees from both Williams and Harvard University and his Ph.D. from Harvard in 1926.

Baxter taught at Colorado College and then at Harvard, progressing from instructor to full professor in 10 years.  He served as the first master of Adams House.  In 1928 he was elected a Fellow of the American Academy of Arts and Sciences. In 1937-1961 he was president of Williams College.  Baxter left Williams for a few years during World War II while he served as research coordinator of information (1941-1943) and director of the Office of Strategic Services (1942-1943).  In 1943 he was the part-time official historian of the Office of Scientific Research and Development, where he wrote Scientists Against Time.

He was a member of the board of trustees of the World Peace Foundation.

References

External links
 Williams College biography 
 James Phinney Baxter, 1893–1975 at Library of Congress Authorities — with 6 catalog records

1893 births
1975 deaths
Pulitzer Prize for History winners
Harvard University alumni
Colorado College faculty
Harvard University faculty
Presidents of Williams College
Williams College alumni
Writers from Portland, Maine
Fellows of the American Academy of Arts and Sciences
Academics from Portland, Maine
20th-century American historians
Portland High School (Maine) alumni
20th-century American male writers
American male non-fiction writers
Baxter family